Moustafa Ben Lahbib (born 1938) is a Moroccan boxer. He competed in the men's middleweight event at the 1960 Summer Olympics. At the 1960 Summer Olympics, he lost to Luigi Napoleoni of Italy.

References

1938 births
Living people
Moroccan male boxers
Olympic boxers of Morocco
Boxers at the 1960 Summer Olympics
Sportspeople from Casablanca
Middleweight boxers
20th-century Moroccan people